Tokajík is a village and municipality in Stropkov District in the Prešov Region of north-eastern Slovakia.

History
In historical records the village was first mentioned in 1430.

During World War II on November 20, 1944, Tokajík was burned by German troops as punishment for aid the inhabitants gave to the partisans. 32 men were shot 1 km North of the village the day before. Only 2, severely injured men from the village survived. The village was restored after war.

Geography
The municipality lies at an altitude of 206 metres and covers an area of 8.242 km². It has a population of about 111 people.

Transportation
There are 5 airports within 110 km of Tokajik.

References

External links
 
 

Villages and municipalities in Stropkov District
Zemplín (region)